The Nils Ericson Terminal is a major bus terminus in Gothenburg, Sweden.  It is placed in the city center just next to Gothenburg Central Station (Centralstationen), and across the street from the main Nordstan shopping center.  The main street and most hotels are within walking distance from the terminal.

The terminal serves many parts of the Västra Götaland County with bus traffic (although many regional destinations are primarily served by regional trains).  Bus companies such as Flixbus, Bus4You, Nettbuss express, Swebus Express and Eurolines serve destinations such as Oslo, Stockholm and Copenhagen. With bus changes, a lot of destinations can be reached.

The bus terminal uses the modern system where buses arrive at gates, and the passengers enter the buses directly from the air-conditioned terminal, much like in modern airports. There are 18 gates indoors (numbered 21-38). There are also 11 gates outdoors with simple shelters (39-49).

The terminal is named after Nils Ericson, a Swedish inventor and mechanical engineer, and brother to John Ericsson.

The terminal was designed by the Norwegian architect, Nils Torp, and received the national Kasper Salin Prize in 1996.

References 

Bus stations in Sweden
Buildings and structures in Gothenburg
Transport in Gothenburg